Speaking Louder than Before is the sixth studio album from contemporary Christian musician Jeremy Camp. It was released on November 24, 2008, and entered the Billboard 200 at No. 38.

Background
In May 2008, Camp went into the studio to begin recording the album. Speaking Louder Than Before was recorded over five days, with Camp spending 12 hours in the studio each day. He co-produced the album with Brown Bannister.

Camp has said that Speaking Louder Than Before has a different theme to his previous releases and that he has "a more clear-cut purpose and vision of what I'm meant to do ... I see the hurt, the lack of direction, in this new generation. I always had a passion for youth, but this album is really aimed at them." Referring to the album's title and theme, he said, "I have walked through the valleys, the mountains, and plains. That's why I'm speaking up, that's why I'm speaking now and loud."

Promotion and release
The first single "There Will Be a Day" was released around early September. It was the most-added song at R&R's AC and CHR charts, and it was also the highest-debuting track in its first week of entering the chart. The song was digitally released on September 23.

The album itself was subsequently released in the United States on November 24, 2008. It debuted at No. 38 on the Billboard 200, with 32,700 copies sold in the first week. Speaking Louder Than Before also reached number one at Billboards Top Christian Albums, and in its first week became Camp's highest-charting album to date.  "There Will Be a Day" reached number one at Christian CHR radio on November 28, and stayed at the top of the chart for two weeks.

A special edition of the album was released on December 5, which included a DVD with an hour of in-studio video footage, a booklet containing journal entries from Camp, a sticker, three art cards and a silicone bracelet.

Track listing

 Personnel 
 Jeremy Camp – lead and backing vocals
 Blair Masters – keyboards, acoustic piano, Hammond B3 organ
 Tom Bukovac – guitars 
 Jerry McPherson – guitars
 Scott Denté – acoustic guitar (12)
 Matt Pierson – bass
 Dan Needham – drums (1-4, 6-9, 12) 
 Chris McHugh – drums (5, 10, 11)
 Eric Darken – percussion 
 Richie Peña – loops (8)
 Matt Balm – backing vocals 
 Luke Brown – backing vocals 
 Adie Camp – backing vocals 
 Jean-Luc Lajoie – backing vocalsString Section (Tracks 4, 5, 7)'
 Phillip Keveren – string arrangements (4, 7)
 Don Chapman – string arrangements (5)
 Monisa Angell, John Catchings, Janet Darnall, Jim Grosjean, Sarighani Reist, Pamela Sixfin and Karen Winklemann – string players

Production 
 Brown Bannister – producer, overdub recording at Townsend Studio, Nashville, Tennessee
 Jeremy Camp – co-producer
 Brandon Ebel – executive producer
 Tyson Paoletti – executive producer, A&R
 Steve Bishir – recording at Dark Horse Studio, Franklin, Tennessee
 Colin Heldt – recording assistant
 Mike Carr – recording assistant
 Billy Whittington – additional engineering, digital editing
 Kent Hooper – additional engineering, digital editing
 Ron Robinson – additional engineering, digital editing
 Craig Swift – additional engineering, digital editing
 Dave Dillbeck – additional engineering, digital editing
 F. Reid Shippen – mixing (1, 2, 3, 5-12) at Sound Stage Studios, Nashville, Tennessee
 Buckley Miller – mixing assistant (1, 2, 3, 5-12)
 J. R. McNeely – mixing ("There Will Be a Day") at Elm South Studios, Franklin, Tennessee
 Ted Jensen – mastering at Sterling Sound, New York City
 Ryan Clark – art direction and design for Invisible Creature, Inc.
 Dave Hill – photography

Accolades

In 2010, the album was nominated for a Dove Award for Pop/Contemporary Album of the Year at the 41st GMA Dove Awards.

Charts

Weekly charts

Year-end charts

References

Jeremy Camp albums
BEC Recordings albums
2008 albums